The men's 100 metres sprint event at the 1976 Olympic Games in Montreal, Quebec, Canada, was held at Olympic Stadium on July 23 and 24. Sixty-three athletes from 40 nations competed. Each nation was limited to 3 athletes per rules in force since the 1930 Olympic Congress. The event was won by Hasely Crawford of Trinidad and Tobago, earning the nation's first gold medal and making Crawford a national hero. Don Quarrie's silver medal made Jamaica only the third country to reach the men's 100 metres podium three consecutive times (after the United States, which had streaks of 9 Games and 7 Games, and Great Britain, which had medaled consecutively in 1920, 1924, and 1928). Valeriy Borzov of the Soviet Union was unable to defend his title, but by taking bronze became the third man to medal twice in the event. For only the second time (after 1928), the United States did not have a medalist in the event.

In the preliminary rounds, all the top athletes were running times in the 10.30s to 10.40s, while by the semi-finals some times dropped to the 10.20s. They took the top 4 from each semi, so Steve Riddick was left out of the final even though he had run faster than Guy Abrahams in the earlier semi.  With the #1 time from the semis, Hasely Crawford was still placed in lane 1, somewhat hidden from the other top contenders in the center of the track, including Harvey Glance, 200 metre specialist Don Quarrie and the defending champion Valeriy Borzov.  From the gun, Borzov was out fast in lane 3 gaining a half a metre on Quarrie next to him in 4, with Glance another half metre behind Quarrie.  As Quarrie slowly gained on Borzov, Crawford was also speeding down lane 1.  Quarrie went past Borzov, but Crawford was already ahead for a narrow victory, the leaning Borzov holding off Glance.

Background

This was the eighteenth time the event was held, having appeared at every Olympics since the first in 1896. Two finalists from 1972 returned: gold medal winner Valeriy Borzov of the Soviet Union and Hasely Crawford of Trinidad and Tobago, who had not finished the Munich final. The favorite was Jamaican Don Quarrie (1970 and 1974 Commonwealth Games champion, with a share of the world record at 9.9 seconds), particularly with American Steve Williams (who had run 9.9 seconds four times) having been injured at the U.S. Olympic trials. Borzov was "not the dominant sprinter he had been in 1972." The top American in Montreal was Harvey Glance, who had run the 9.9 second world record time twice. Cuban Silvio Leonard had also matched that time once.

Three nations appeared in the event for the first time: Barbados, Belize, and the Netherlands Antilles. The United States was the only nation to have appeared at each of the first eighteen Olympic men's 100 metres events.

Competition format

The event retained the same basic four round format introduced in 1920: heats, quarterfinals, semifinals, and a final. The "fastest loser" system, introduced in 1968, was used again to ensure that the quarterfinals and subsequent rounds had exactly 8 runners per heat; this time, that system applied only in the preliminary heats.

The first round consisted of 9 heats, each with 6–8 athletes. The top three runners in each heat advanced, along with the next five fastest runners overall. This made 32 quarterfinalists, who were divided into 4 heats of 8 runners. The top four runners in each quarterfinal advanced, with no "fastest loser" places. The 16 semifinalists competed in two heats of 8, with the top four in each semifinal advancing to the eight-man final.

Records

These are the standing world and Olympic records (in seconds) prior to the 1976 Summer Olympics.

Results

Heats

The heats were held on July 23, 1976.

Heat 1

Heat 2

Heat 3

Heat 4

Heat 5

Heat 6

Heat 7

Heat 8

Heat 9

Quarterfinals

The quarterfinals were held on July 23, 1976.

Quarterfinal 1

Quarterfinal 2

Quarterfinal 3

Quarterfinal 4

Semifinals

The semifinals were held on July 24, 1976.

Semifinal 1

Semifinal 2

Final

The final was held on July 24, 1976.

See also
 1972 Men's Olympic 100 metres (Munich)
 1978 Men's European Championships 100 metres (Prague)
 1980 Men's Olympic 100 metres (Moscow)

References

 1
100 metres at the Olympics
Men's events at the 1976 Summer Olympics